The Čapljina Pumped-Storage Hydroelectric Power Plant is a pumped-storage hydroelectric power plant (PSHPP) or pumped hydroelectric energy storage power plant (PHESPP) type of hydroelectric power plant, whose powerhouse (generation hall, generating station or generating plant) is situated underground near Svitava, in Bosnia and Herzegovina. It's one of country's largest hydroelectric power plants of any type, having an installed electric capacity of 420 MW.

Lake Vrutak is artificial reservoir on the Trebišnjica river in Popovo Polje, near Hutovo village, and serves as compensation and storage basin for Čapljina Pump-Storage Hydroelectric Power Plant.

See also 
Lake Vrutak
Svitavsko Lake
Hutovo Blato
Popovo Polje
Trebišnjica
Neretva

References

Vanjski linkovi 

 Čapljina portal umrli

Hydroelectric power stations in Bosnia and Herzegovina
Underground hydroelectric power stations in Bosnia and Herzegovina
Čapljina
Lower Horizons Hydroelectric Power Stations System
Trebišnjica